Shahrulnizam Mustapa (born 2 April 1981), also known as Arul, is a Malaysian former footballer who last played for Felcra. He also played for the Malaysia national team.

Club career

PDRM FA
Shahrul who previously played and started his professional football career with Polis Di-Raja Malaysia FA in 2001. After only one season, he returned to his hometown team, Perak starting from 2002.

Perak FA
As the 2002 season progressed, Shahrul was part of the team when Perak won the Malaysia Premier League title for two consecutive years in 2002 and 2003.

Kedah FA
Shahrulnizam left Perak FA on 17 October 2008 when Kedah head coach Mohd Azraai Khor Abdullah succeeded in obtaining his signature to replace Nelson San Martin to be employed in the box-to-box midfield role, although he can be deployed as a right-sided midfielder. After a week in the Canaries environment, Kedah FA management had made a decision that Shahrulnizam be handed the number 8 shirt, the number previously worn by Kedah legendary and longest-serving foreign player, Cornelius Huggins.

National team
Shahrul has also represented Malaysia on the international stage. He received his first cap against Cambodia on 18 June 2007. He was also a part of Malaysia's 2007 AFC Asian Cup squad and get involved in all group stage matches during the competition.

External links
 

1981 births
Living people
Malaysian people of Malay descent
Malaysian footballers
Malaysia international footballers
2007 AFC Asian Cup players
People from Ipoh
People from Perak
Perak F.C. players
PDRM FA players
Kedah Darul Aman F.C. players
Felda United F.C. players
Malaysia Super League players
Association football midfielders